St. Paul's Gekano is an extra-county school located in Nyamira County. St. Paul's Gekano was started in 1964 by the Catholic Diocese of Kisii under the headship of Rev. Father Tiberius Charles Mogendi. Records indicate that it is the oldest established secondary school in Nyamira County. It is a boys' school offering secondary education of the Kenya education system. The school offers boarding facilities to all the students.

Notable alumni
 Hon. Timothy Bosire – MP, Kitutu Masaba Constituency (2013–2017)
 Lawrence Adams (Larry)
Sorobi Moturi Erastus(Radio Presenter – Egesa FM – Royal Media Services)
Kipsang Ngeno Manager
Dr.Daniel Atuke GLUK
Prof.Edward Ontita UoN
Adv George Mboga
Nyauma Nyasani UN
Thomas Nyamao Accountant
Ken Oenga UK
Ken Osinde UN
Prof Richard Onwonga UoN
Dr Edward Okumu USA
Mishael Ondieki USA
Dr Benard Oeri UAE
Dr Benard Marasa USA
John Omonywa Foreign Affairs
Henry Ongondi USA
Dr Neford Ongaro MTRH
Harun Motongwa Canada
Edward Mokaya Canada

External links

CS Matiang'i visiting St Paul's Gekano High School https://twitter.com/fredmatiangi/status/914406314482323456?lang=en

Nyamira County
Education in Nyanza Province